This is a list of actors who have co-starred in films with The Three Stooges.  Inclusion on this list should be reserved for notable actors that can be confirmed as taking supporting roles (either credited or uncredited) in films commonly regarded as having the Three Stooges as primary characters.  Films where the Three Stooges appear as a guest or cameo appearance, or the actors who portray them appear outside the character of The Three Stooges should not be considered.

List 
This list is incomplete.  You can help Wikipedia by expanding it.

References

Lists of film actors